Nguyen Thanh Tri, also known professionally as Sean Lu, is a Vietnamese Canadian actor based in Quebec. He is most noted for his performance as Hiên in the 2019 film The Greatest Country in the World (Le meilleur pays du monde), for which he was a Prix Iris nominee for Best Actor at the 24th Quebec Cinema Awards in 2022.

References

External links

also known as Sean Lu: 

21st-century Canadian male actors
Canadian male film actors
Male actors from Quebec
Canadian people of Vietnamese descent
Living people
Year of birth missing (living people)